Viktorie Švejdová (born 24 June 2002) is a Czech ice hockey goaltender and member of the Czech national ice hockey team, currently playing in the Swedish Women's Hockey League (SDHL) with SDE Hockey.

Playing career 
Švejdová's senior club career began in the Czech Women's 2. liga at age 10 with the women’s representative team of HC Bílí Tygři Liberec. In 2017, she began attending the ice hockey academy of Modo Hockey in Örnsköldsvik, Sweden. In Sweden, she had the opportunity to play alongside other elite junior players and with senior league teams, taking on the role of starting goaltender for Modo Hockey 2 in the Damettan, a position she retained for several seasons. She also dressed for games in the J18 Elit with Modo Hockey J18 and played in the J16 Elit with Modo Hockey U16.

During the 2020–21 season and 2021–22 season, Švejdová has played predominantly in the SDHL, serving as Modo’s backup netminder behind Czech national team teammate Klára Peslarová.

She signed with SDE Hockey ahead of the 2022–23 SDHL season.

International 
Švejdová made her senior national team debut at the 2021 IIHF Women's World Championship. As a junior player with the Czech national under-18 team, she participated in the IIHF Women's U18 World Championships in 2018 and 2019.

References

External links 
 

Living people
2002 births
Czech expatriate ice hockey players in Sweden
Czech women's ice hockey goaltenders
Ice hockey players at the 2022 Winter Olympics
Modo Hockey Dam players
Olympic ice hockey players of the Czech Republic
SDE Hockey players
Ice hockey people from Brno